Satteldorf is a municipality in the district of Schwäbisch Hall in Baden-Württemberg in Germany.

Geography
Satteldorf is located on the Hohenloher level on the Jagst, a right tributary of the Neckar, about 4 km north of Crailsheim. The eastern districts are located directly on the Frankenhöhe. The municipality is bordered to the north by Wallhausen, to the east by the Bavarian municipality of Schnelldorf, to the southeast by Kreßberg, to the south by Crailsheim and to the west by the town of Kirchberg an der Jagst.

References

Schwäbisch Hall (district)
Württemberg